Dol Ammad is a heavy metal band formed in 2000 by Greek keyboard player Thanasis Lightbridge. Dol Ammad is characterizeded with instrumentation which layers conventional metal instrumentation (bass, drums, and electric guitar), synthesizers, and the vocal support of a fourteen-member four-part choir. Lightbridge describes his music as "electronica art metal" and cites electronic music pioneers Jean Michel Jarre and Vangelis as key influences. The band derives its name from a fuel refinery in the computer game Descent 3.

Lineup

Current members

Band
Thanasis Lightbridge - synthesizers
Alex Holzwarth (also formerly of Rhapsody of Fire) - drums and percussion
Dim - electric guitar
Nick Terry - bass guitar

Choir
Soprano - Mary Palaska, Kortessa Tsifodimou, Alexandra Voulgari
Alto - Vicky Alexaki, Sofia Patsi, Maria Stolaki, Ntina Strani
Tenor - Alexandros Barmpas, Panos Iampoultakis, Themis Mpasdekis, Anestis Papageorgiou
Bass - Kyriakos Chouvardas, Petros Moraitis, Yiannis Tsalouhidis

Sound engineer
 argystream - argy papageorgiou

Guests
D. C. Cooper (Silent Force, Royal Hunt) - vocals (Ocean Dynamics)

Former members

Band
Jimmy Wicked - guitar (Star Tales, Demo)

Choir
Zoe Tsokanou, soprano (Star Tales, Demo)
Marieta Pangiotidou, alto (Star Tales, Demo)

Discography
Demo No. 1 EP (2001)
Demo EP (2002)
Star Tales (2004)
Ocean Dynamics (2006)
Winds Of The Sun (2010)
Cosmic Gods: Episode I - Hyperspeed (2012)
Cosmic Gods: Episode II - Astroatlas (2018)

References

External links

General

Interviews
 Sea of Tranquility - "Dol Ammad - A new Sound, A New Genre"
 POWERMETAL.de - "Interview Dol Ammad"
 Metal Perspective - "Interview with Thanasis Lightbridge"
 Heavy Law - "Dol Ammad"
 Metal Fan - "Een interview met Thanasis Lightbridge van Dol Ammad"
 Vampster - "DOL AMMAD: Die musikalische Freiheit, die ich mir nehme"
 Lords of Metal - "One small step for Dol Ammad, one giant leap for metal"
 Lords of Metal - "Interview Dol Ammad"
 Lords of Metal - "Dol Ammad"
 Nucleus - "A Great Adventure"
 Melodic Hard Rock Today - "Interview Dol Ammad"
 Progressia.net - "ENTRETIEN : DOL AMMAD"
Dol Ammad on Avantgarde-metal.com 2007

Greek heavy metal musical groups
Musical groups established in 2000
Musical quartets
Greek symphonic metal musical groups
Musical groups from Thessaloniki
2000 establishments in Greece